Mercy Akpanchang Nku Esimoneze (born 17 July 1976 in Boki) is a retired Nigerian sprinter who specialized in the 100 metres.

Achievements

Personal bests
100 metres - 11.03 s (1999)
200 metres - 22.53 s (1999)

References

External links
 

1976 births
Living people
Nigerian female sprinters
Athletes (track and field) at the 2000 Summer Olympics
Athletes (track and field) at the 2004 Summer Olympics
Olympic athletes of Nigeria
Athletes (track and field) at the 2002 Commonwealth Games
Athletes (track and field) at the 2006 Commonwealth Games
Commonwealth Games competitors for Nigeria
People from Cross River State
African Games gold medalists for Nigeria
African Games medalists in athletics (track and field)
Goodwill Games medalists in athletics
Athletes (track and field) at the 1999 All-Africa Games
Competitors at the 2001 Goodwill Games
Goodwill Games gold medalists in athletics
Olympic female sprinters
20th-century Nigerian women